Yihun Lhatso, also transliterated from Tibetan as Yilung Latsho, is a glacial lake in the Tibetan area of western Sichuan Province, China.

Geography
Yihun Lhatso rests in a valley on the north side of the Chola Mountains at the foot of Rongme Ngatra. It is found 10km south of the town of Manigango in Dege County, Garze Prefecture. The lake is drained by the Tro Chu, a tributary of the Yalong River which eventually joins with the Yangtze. The lake is passed by Highway 317 on its way over Cho La mountain pass.

Culture
As part of the historic Kham region in Tibet, Yihun Lhatso has long been known to the Tibetan people.  It is considered a sacred lake in Tibetan Buddhism and a kora route circles the lake.  The lake and adjacent streams are known for the hundreds of boulders that have been carved into mani stones.  Today, it is a common tourist stop for hiking and the entire Yihun Lhatso area charges an admission fee.

References

Lakes of China